New Indian Model School, Dubai is an Indian School in UAE. It was established in 1980 and is located in Al Garhoud, Dubai, United Arab Emirates. It is also known as N.I.Model School or NIMS Dubai. The school was founded by Al-Haj (Dr.) M. K. Kamaluddin, to provide affordable, modern education to the Indian community. The school was inaugurated on 1 May 1980 by H.E. Rashid Abdulla Thaha, Deputy Minister of Education, in the presence of Hon. Late. C. H. Mohammed Koya, the then Chief Minister of Kerala and Mr. Muthu Venkataramanan, the Consul General of India. The school now caters for the educational needs of around seven thousand children

Multiple syllabuses

The school follows multiple syllabuses which include CBSE.

A summary of the inspection ratings for New Indian Model School 

A summary of all the schools in Dubai's ratings can be found at KHDA School Ratings.

Other campuses
   The Central School, Dubai
 The Model School, Abu Dhabi
    New Indian Model School, Al Ain
   New Indian Model School, Sharjah
 The Oxford School, Calicut
 The Oxford School, Kollam
 The Oxford School, Trivandrum

References

Educational institutions established in 1980
Indian international schools in the United Arab Emirates
Schools in Dubai
1980 establishments in the United Arab Emirates